Marilyn's Vitamins were a Canadian punk rock band formed in 1995 from Orangeville, Ontario, Canada, playing their last show December 28, 1999 in Toronto, Ontario. In those near-five years they released two albums on Raw Energy and 7"s on Ductape, and Ugly Pop Vinyl. A posthumous collection was released on Underground Operations in 2003. The band consisted of Rob Moir (guitar), Danny Complex (guitar/vocals), Colin Lichti (vocals), Adam Cook (bass/vocals), Jeff Breen (guitar), Kristoffer Wood (bass) and Shawn Dickey (drums). Members of the band went on to form Bombs Over Providence, Hostage Life and Dead Letter Dept. Their lyrics mainly dealt with various political issues of the time.

Members 
 Jeff Breen (AKA "Jeff Obnoxious")
 Dan Christopher (AKA "Danny Complex")
 Adam Cook (AKA "Adam Purile")
 Shawn Dickey (AKA "Dick Teenager")
 Colin Lichti (AKA "Colin Vitamin", Colin Ridiculouspunkpseudonym)
 Rob Moir (AKA Rob Stiff, Rob Potential)
 Kris Wood (AKA "Wooder")

Discography 
 1995: Self Titled (demo)
 1995: Down and Out In Levittown (demo)
 1996: In These Shoes (Raw Energy)
 1997: Squeegee Girl 7" (Ductape Records)
 1998: Politics On The Dance Floor (Raw Energy)
 1999: Meanwhile, During the Class War 7" (Ugly Pop Records)

Compilations 
 2002: (coles) Notes From The Underground (Underground Operations)
 2003: Vans Don't Run On Love And Records Aren't Pressed With Smiles (Underground Operations)

See also 

 Music of Canada
 Canadian rock
 List of Canadian musicians
 List of bands from Canada
 :Category:Canadian musical groups

References

External links
 Marilyn's Vitamins Fan page (archived)
 Marilyn's Vitamins on Last.fm

Musical groups established in 1995
Musical groups disestablished in 2000
Canadian pop punk groups
Canadian punk rock groups
Anarcho-punk groups
Musical groups from Ontario
Orangeville, Ontario
1995 establishments in Ontario
2000 disestablishments in Ontario